County Limerick was a constituency represented in the Irish House of Commons until 1800.

Members of Parliament

Notes

References

Historic constituencies in County Limerick
Constituencies of the Parliament of Ireland (pre-1801)
1800 disestablishments in Ireland
Constituencies disestablished in 1800